The following lists events that happened during 1989 in Sri Lanka.

Incumbents
President: J. R. Jayewardene (until 2 January); Ranasinghe Premadasa (starting 2 January)
Prime Minister: Ranasinghe Premadasa (until 2 January); Dingiri Banda Wijetunga (starting 2 January)
Chief Justice: Parinda Ranasinghe

Governors
Governor of Central Province: E. L. B. Hurulle 
Governor of North Central Province: Dingiri Bandara Welagedara (until May); E. L. Senanayake (starting May)
Governor of North Eastern Province: Nalin Seneviratne (until 31 January); Montague Jayawickrama (starting 1 February) 
Governor of North Western Province: Dingiri Banda Wijetunga 
Governor of Sabaragamuwa: Noel Wimalasena 
Governor of Southern Province: Abdul Bakeer Markar 
Governor of Uva: P. C. Imbulana (starting May)
Governor of Western Province: Suppiah Sharvananda

Chief Ministers
Chief Minister of Central Province: W. M. P. B. Dissanayake 
Chief Minister of North Central Province: G. D. Mahindasoma 
Chief Minister of North Eastern Province: Varatharaja Perumal 
Chief Minister of North Western Province: Gamini Jayawickrama Perera 
Chief Minister of Sabaragamuwa: G. V. Punchinilame 
Chief Minister of Southern Province: M. S. Amarasiri 
Chief Minister of Uva: Percy Samaraweera 
Chief Minister of Western Province: Susil Moonesinghe

Events
 The JVP Insurrection comes to an end in 1989.
 Sri Lanka has their 9th parliamentary elections with Ranasinghe Premadasa winning with a total of 125 seats.

Notes 

a.  Gunaratna, Rohan. (1998). Pg.353, Sri Lanka's Ethnic Crisis and National Security, Colombo: South Asian Network on Conflict Research.

References

 

 
Years of the 20th century in Sri Lanka
Sri Lanka